Port-Saint-Louis-du-Rhône is a commune in the Bouches-du-Rhône department in southern France.

History
The commune was created in 1904 from parts of the communes of Arles and Fos-sur-Mer. The Saint-Louis channel was dug in 1871. The parish was established in 1886.

Population

Features
Port-Saint-Louis-du-Rhône is an industrial town and port annex of Marseille at the mouth of the Rhône River, and includes many parks, large avenues and large farmhouses known as camarguais.

The town has three popular beaches: Napoleon beach, Olga beach, and Carteau beach.

There are many marshes and cultivated plants nearby, and vast salt-water marshes of the Camargue swamp.

Local wildlife includes herds of wild horses and pink flamingos being in the marshes.

Industry
The Camargue produces primarily salt and mineral oil. There are also petrochemical factories and grain mills.

See also
 Communes of the Bouches-du-Rhône department

References

Communes of Bouches-du-Rhône
Bouches-du-Rhône communes articles needing translation from French Wikipedia
Populated coastal places in France